Azar Karadas (born 9 August 1981) is a Norwegian former footballer. Although he could also play as a central defender, he operated primarily as a centre forward.

He had three spells with Brann, where he began and ended his career, winning Tippeligaen with that team and with Rosenborg. He also competed professionally in Portugal, England, Germany and Turkey.

Club career
Karadas was born in Nordfjordeid of Turkish origin, his surname meaning "Black stone" in Turkish. He started his career with Eid IL, moving to the professionals in 1999 with SK Brann.

On 13 March 2002, Karadas signed for Rosenborg BK, reportedly receiving death threats over this move. At his new club, his performances soon earned him a call-up to the Norwegian under-21s, and it was not long before foreign eyes focused on him. He further enhanced his reputation by scoring two goals against Inter Milan in a UEFA Champions League game, a 2–2 home draw; he was linked with the likes of Roda JC, Liverpool and Udinese Calcio, but Portuguese club S.L. Benfica eventually bought the 23-year-old, and he joined the squad of veteran coach Giovanni Trapattoni after signing a four-year contract.

After one season at Benfica, where he scored four goals (including a brace at S.C. Beira-Mar in a 3–2 win) and helped them win the Primeira Liga championship after 11 years, Karadas was loaned to Premier League side Portsmouth for 2005–06. His  volley, which helped the relegation-threatened team earn a crucial 1–1 draw against Bolton Wanderers on 1 February 2006, was both his highlight and only goal of the campaign, in 20 overall appearances.

A 16 June 2006 Norwegian press release reported that Benfica and Brann had agreed on a Karadas transfer back to Bergen. The deal was speculated to be worth , where he was to give up £435,000 worth of bonuses Benfica owed him. Only his personal contract was an issue, as the player refused to give up a £350,000 compensation which had to be paid to him whenever he was sold from the Lisbon club.

Despite being declared unwanted in Lisbon, Karadas returned to Benfica after his transfer to Brann fell through. On 16 August 2006, news broke out that he was in negotiations with Germany's 1. FC Kaiserslautern, which had just been relegated to the 2. Bundesliga; the clubs finally agreed with a one-year loan deal, brokered by his uncle who was also his agent.

Karadas made his debut in German football on 27 August 2006 in a 2–0 home league victory over SC Paderborn 07, starting but being substituted in the 61st minute. On 9 September he scored his first goal for his new team, in its 2–0 away victory over amateurs 1. FC Gera 03 for the first round of the German Cup. His first league goal came 20 days later in a 1–1 draw at SpVgg Unterhaching, his only of the season in an eventual sixth-place finish; he was also sent off after being shown two yellow cards in a local derby against 1. FC Köln, which ended in a 2–2 draw.

On 24 August 2007, Karadas signed a contract with Brann for a second spell with the club. In his comeback to Brann Stadion, in a match against Sandefjord Fotball on 2 September, he was greeted as a hero and a banner stating "Vi hatet deg så mye, fordi vi elsker deg så høyt!" ("We hated you so much, because we love you so much!"). The season ended with Tippeligaen conquest, with four goals in only eight appearances from the player.

On 1 September 2009, Karadas signed a three-year contract with Kasımpaşa S.K. of Turkey, scoring only once in seven contests in his debut campaign as the team ranked 11th the Süper Lig. On 27 May 2012 he netted a critical goal that brought his team back to the top flight, in the play-off match against Adanaspor.

Karadas joined Sogndal Fotball in August 2012, on a short-term deal. He was injured early on, and only played in seven league matches. After being a free agent for three months he decided to return to the club in February 2013, leaving at the end of the season and returning for a third stint in 2014.

On 16 July 2014, five years later, Karadas returned to Brann.

International career
Karadas made his debut for the Norway national team on 24 January 2001, starting in a 3–2 win over South Korea for that year's Lunar New Year Cup. He returned to the team two years later for a friendly tour of the Middle East, scoring his only goal as a substitute to equalise in a 2–1 win over Oman.

Karadas earned ten caps, over the coure of seven years. His final game was a 2–2 exhibition at home to Uruguay, two years after his previous appearance.

Coaching career
After not renewing his playing contract with Brann, Karadas signed a three-year-contract on 6 January to serve as an assistant coach for Brann 2 while taking his coaching badges; he had already finished his UEFA B-Licence while finishing his playing career. At the end of December 2019, he declined an offer to take up the role as head coach for newly formed Øygarden FK. After Brann 2 coach Roger Naustan announced he would leave at the end of his contract, Karadas was promoted to head coach from 1 January 2021.

Career statistics

Club
Source:

International
Source:

|}

Honours
Rosenborg
Tippeligaen: 2002, 2003, 2004
Norwegian Football Cup: 2003

Benfica
Primeira Liga: 2004–05
Supertaça Cândido de Oliveira: Runner-up 2004

Brann
Tippeligaen: 2007

References

External links
 
 
 
  
  
 
 
 
 

1981 births
Living people
People from Eid, Norway
Norwegian people of Turkish descent
Norwegian footballers
Association football defenders
Association football forwards
Association football utility players
Eliteserien players
SK Brann players
Rosenborg BK players
Sogndal Fotball players
Primeira Liga players
S.L. Benfica footballers
Premier League players
Portsmouth F.C. players
2. Bundesliga players
1. FC Kaiserslautern players
Süper Lig players
TFF First League players
Kasımpaşa S.K. footballers
Norway under-21 international footballers
Norway international footballers
Norwegian expatriate footballers
Expatriate footballers in Portugal
Expatriate footballers in England
Expatriate footballers in Germany
Expatriate footballers in Turkey
Norwegian expatriate sportspeople in Portugal
Norwegian expatriate sportspeople in England
Norwegian expatriate sportspeople in Germany
Norwegian expatriate sportspeople in Turkey
Sportspeople from Vestland